Parachronistis sellaris is a moth of the family Gelechiidae. It is found in Korea and the Russian Far East.

The forewings are whitish to pale light brown with clearly defined and large distinct black spots. Adults are on wing from early May to mid-August.

References

Moths described in 1985
Parachronistis